The 1980 Sun Bowl was a college football postseason bowl game played on December 27 in El Paso, Texas, between the Nebraska Cornhuskers and the Mississippi State Bulldogs.

Background
An all-too-familiar loss to #9 Oklahoma in the regular season finale cost the Cornhuskers the Big Eight Conference title and an Orange Bowl invitation, and they settled for the Sun Bowl.

The Bulldogs finished third in the Southeastern Conference behind eventual national champion Georgia and Alabama in Emory Bellard's second year as head coach, closing the regular season on a five-game winning streak. Among those November victories were a 6–3 defeat of two-time defending national champion Alabama, a 55–31 rout of LSU, and a conquest of archrival Ole Miss in the Egg Bowl. All three of those big victories came at Mississippi Veterans Memorial Stadium in Jackson.

Game summary
Todd Brown gave Nebraska an early 7–0 lead with his 23–yard touchdown run 2:30 into the game.

Dana Moore narrowed the lead with his 47-yard field goal with 7:12 left in the third quarter, but Nebraska responded less than five minutes later on  two-yard touchdown run to make it  at the end of three quarters.

The Cornhusker defense forced two interceptions, four lost fumbles, and 

Nebraska climbed to seventh in the final AP poll and Mississippi State fell to nineteenth.

The attendance of 34,723 was a Sun Bowl record, aided by favorable weather.

Scoring
First quarter
Nebraska – Todd Brown 23 run (Kevin Seibel kick)

Second quarter
Nebraska – Field goal, Seibel 22
Nebraska – Jeff Finn 8 pass from Jeff Quinn (Seibel kick)

Third quarter
Mississippi State – Field goal, Dana Moore 47
Nebraska – Andra Franklin 2 run (Kevin Seibel kick)

Fourth quarter
Mississippi State – John Bond 1 run (Moore kick)
Nebraska – Tim McCrady 52 pass from Quinn (Klein kick)
Mississippi State – Michael Haddix 11 pass from Bond (Moore kick)

Statistics
{| class=wikitable style="text-align:center"
|-
! Statistics !! style="background:#660000; color:#ffffff"|MississippiState !! style="background:#f5002f; color:#ffffff"|   Nebraska  
|-
|align=left|First downs ||15 ||16
|-
|align=left|Rushes–yards ||53–156 || 56–161
|-
|align=left|Passing yards ||102 ||159
|-
|align=left|Total yards ||258 ||320
|-
|align=left|Passes (C–A–I) ||7–19–2 ||9–19–1
|-
|align=left|Fumbles–lost ||5–4 ||1–1
|-
|align=left|Turnovers by ||6 ||2
|-
|align=left|Penalties–yards ||5–50 ||8–42
|}

References

Sun Bowl
Sun Bowl
Mississippi State Bulldogs football bowl games
Nebraska Cornhuskers football bowl games
December 1980 sports events in the United States
1980 in sports in Texas